The Moderate Women is a women's wing in Sweden, connected to the Moderate Party. It was established in 1912. since women had been allowing voting rights during municipal elections in 1910.

References

External links

Official website 

1912 establishments in Sweden
Organizations established in 1912
Women's wings of political parties in Sweden
Moderate Party
Organizations based in Stockholm